Corey Woolfolk (born February 2, 1979, in Ann Arbor, Michigan) is a former American soccer forward, and current chairman of Gibraltar Second Division team Europa Point, as well as part of a consortium owning Dundalk.

Woolfolk attended Pioneer High School, where he was a 1996 first team All State and NSCAA High School All American.  He then attended Stanford University, where he played on the men's soccer team from 1997 to 2000.  He graduated with a bachelor's degree in urban planning.  On February 6, 2001, the San Jose Earthquakes drafted Woolfolk in the 5th round (49th overall in the 2001 MLS SuperDraft.  He played seven preseason games, scoring four goals.  The Earthquakes waived Woolfolk on May 30, 2001, to free up a roster spot for Landon Donovan.

On June 18, 2001, Woolfolk signed with the Minnesota Thunder in the USL A-League.  He broke his foot in 2002 and lost most of the season, playing part of the time with the Dayton Gemini of the Premier Development League and serving as an assistant coach with the University of Michigan men's soccer team.  In 2003, he played for the Pittsburgh Riverhounds then in 2004, he moved to the Rochester Rhinos.  In 2005, he joined the Puerto Rico Islanders, where he was the team's second leading scorer with nine goals.  On February 1, 2006, he signed with the Vancouver Whitecaps.  He suffered a stress fracture in the pre-season and played only one game before with Vancouver.  The team released him in December 2006.  In 2007, he played three games for the Atlanta Silverbacks.

Since retirement, Woolfolk has founded Pitchwise Holdings and become a venture capital investor in Silicon Valley. In November 2017, along with Boston-based financier Peter Grieve, he headed a consortium to buy a controlling stake in Europa Point, who at the time were playing in the Gibraltar Premier Division.

References

External links
 FC Dallas profile

1983 births
Living people
American soccer coaches
American soccer players
Stanford Cardinal men's soccer players
USL First Division players
USL Second Division players
USL League Two players
Minnesota Thunder players
Dayton Gemini players
Pittsburgh Riverhounds SC players
Rochester New York FC players
Puerto Rico Islanders players
Vancouver Whitecaps (1986–2010) players
Atlanta Silverbacks players
San Francisco Seals (soccer) players
Michigan Wolverines men's soccer coaches
Soccer players from Michigan
A-League (1995–2004) players
San Jose Earthquakes draft picks
Association football midfielders
People from Ann Arbor, Michigan